Zenonas Juknevičius (born 10 June 1949 in Pasvalys District Municipality) is a Lithuanian politician. In 1990 he was among those who signed the Act of the Re-Establishment of the State of Lithuania.

External links
 Biography 

1949 births
Living people
Ministers of Justice of Lithuania
People from Pasvalys District Municipality
20th-century Lithuanian politicians